Galesburg Township is a township in Kingman County, Kansas, USA.  As of the 2000 census, its population was 254.

Geography
Galesburg Township covers an area of 35.49 square miles (91.92 square kilometers); of this, 0.09 square miles (0.24 square kilometers) or 0.26 percent is water.

Unincorporated towns
 Midway
 Waterloo
(This list is based on USGS data and may include former settlements.)

Adjacent townships
 Albion Township, Reno County (north)
 Ninnescah Township, Reno County (northeast)
 Evan Township (east)
 Vinita Township (southeast)
 Dale Township (south)
 Ninnescah Township (southwest)
 White Township (west)
 Roscoe Township, Reno County (northwest)

Cemeteries
The township contains three cemeteries: Lebanon, Saint Louis, and Waterloo.

Major highways
 U.S. Route 54
 K-17 (Kansas highway)

References
 U.S. Board on Geographic Names (GNIS)
 United States Census Bureau cartographic boundary files

External links
 US-Counties.com
 City-Data.com

Townships in Kingman County, Kansas
Townships in Kansas